The 1903–04 Princeton Tigers men's ice hockey season was the 5th season of play for the program.

Season
The Tigers' season was highlighted by a three-game set against Yale in Pittsburgh where Princeton came away with an even split. Princeton was forced to forfeit the game against Harvard on January 23 due to the Tigers being unable to participate.

Roster

Standings

Schedule and Results

|-
!colspan=12 style=";" | Regular Season

References

Princeton Tigers men's ice hockey seasons
Princeton
Princeton
Princeton
Princeton